Hovhannes Hisarian (born 1827 in Constantinople, Ottoman Empire – died 1916 in Constantinople, Ottoman Empire) was an Ottoman Armenian writer, novelist, archeologist, editor, and educator. He was considered the first Armenian romantic novelist.

Biography 

Hovhannes Hisarian was born and educated in Constantinople. After completing his studies, he became a teacher and professor in many Ottoman public educational institutions. On January 1, 1851 he started and became chief editor of a monthly periodical called Panaser (Philologist).  The goal of this periodical was to "enlighten, educate, and further progress the nation." After operating for a year, it ceased its operations.
He then founded a French periodical called Journal Asiatic de Constantinople (Asiatic Journal of Constantinople).
He died in Constantinople in 1916 at the age of 89.

Writing career 

Hovhannes Hisarian is considered the first Armenian romantic novelist in the vernacular Ashkharhabar dialect because of his novel Khosrov yev Makruhi (Khosrov and Makruhi, 1851).
The story is about a fictional family who undergo a considerable number of problems due to their personal interests, jealousy, love, and betrayal.

His second novel, Nern Kam Kataratz Ashkhari (The Antichrist, or the end of the world, 1867) was also written in the same style as Khosrov Yev Makruhi, however the plot and storyline was about religious and metaphysical sentiment.

Even though he tends to write in the Ashkharhabar vernacular, he has published some of his poetry in the Classical Krapar dialect as well. These poems are collected in a volume called Tivan Vor E Dagharan (The Divan Which is Poetry, 1909).

Due to his interest in archeology, he has written many essay and articles pertaining to archeology and the study of it.

External links
Hovhannes Hisarian's Divan Vor E Dagharan (In Armenian) available to read online.

References 

Armenians from the Ottoman Empire
19th-century writers from the Ottoman Empire
1827 births
1916 deaths
Writers from Istanbul
Archaeologists from the Ottoman Empire
19th-century historians from the Ottoman Empire